Stepanchikovo is the name of several rural localities in Russia:
Stepanchikovo, Moscow Oblast, a village under the administrative jurisdiction of Domodedovo Town Under Oblast Jurisdiction in Moscow Oblast; 
Stepanchikovo, Gavrilov-Yamsky District, Yaroslavl Oblast, a village in Ilyinsky Rural Okrug of Gavrilov-Yamsky District in Yaroslavl Oblast
Stepanchikovo, Nekrasovsky District, Yaroslavl Oblast, a village in Lapinsky Rural Okrug of Nekrasovsky District in Yaroslavl Oblast